Dorra is a village in Djibouti in the mid-north of Tadjoura Region, the largest region. It is about 237 kilometers north-west of Djibouti City and 65 km (40 mi) south of the border with Eritrea and east of the border with Ethiopia. At Dorra rock paintings have been found.

Climate
The average annual temperature in Dorra is 29.1 °C. About 165 mm of precipitation falls annually. The driest month is June with 4 mm, and nine months of the year tend to be arid, with on average no more than 13mm of rain per month. Average precipitation in August, accounting for years when the rains in this area arrive or do not arrive, is 30 mm - the three months when typically quantities of rain supporting grassland means there is significant herding in this eastern extreme of a huge escarpment reaching beyond the border and rising to the central parts of the Ethiopian Highlands.

Dorra has a hot semi-arid climate (BSh) in Köppen-Geiger system.

References

External links
Satellite map at Maplandia.com

Populated places in Djibouti
Tadjourah Region